Miye is a given name. Notable people with this name include:

 Miye D'Oench (born 1994), American ice hockey player
 Miye Matsukata (1922–1981), Japanese-born American jewelry designer
 Miye Oni (born 1997), Nigerian-American basketball player
 Miye Ota, American teacher of dance